Methoxyestrone may refer to:

 2-Methoxyestrone
 3-Methoxyestrone
 4-Methoxyestrone